Army Institute of Business Administration (AIBA), Sylhet, is a business school run by the Bangladesh Army located at Jalalabad Cantonment, Sylhet. As the institute is affiliated with the Bangladesh University of Professionals (BUP), the academic curriculum is approved and regulated by the BUP academic council and the syndicate.

History 
Army Institute of Business Administration, Sylhet was established on January 15, 2015, at Jalalabad Cantonment, Sylhet. Brigadier General Md. Zahirul Islam, NDC, PSC, G (Retd) is the institute's founding director.

Location 
The institute is located at Jalalabad Cantonment, around eight kilometers northwest of Sylhet, beside the Sylhet - Tamabil Highway, and is temporarily set up at the campus of Jalalabad Cantonment Public School and College (JCPSC), Sylhet. The development plan of the permanent campus is under process now.

Administration
AIBA, Sylhet is administered by Bangladesh Army through the Area Headquarters, Sylhet. The Area Commander of Sylhet area is the Chief Patron of AIBA, Sylhet. The institute is governed by an eighteen-member governing body consisting of representatives of the army, faculty members, administrative personnel, students, and parents representatives.

Academic curriculum 
The Bangladesh University of Professionals administers the academic curriculum in accordance with the rules of the University Grants Commission of Bangladesh. The current curriculum of AIBA, Sylhet, consists of Bachelor of Business Administration (BBA) and Master of Business Administration (MBA) programs. Major areas of specialization include Operations Management, Accounting, Finance, Marketing, Human Resource Management, and Supply Chain Management. The current intake for BBA is one per year, and for MBA, three intakes per year.

See also
 Army Institute of Business Administration, Savar
Bangladesh University of Professionals

References

Bangladesh University of Professionals
Bangladesh Army
Education in Sylhet
2015 establishments in Bangladesh